Bill Murphy (born 1946) is a former American professional wide receiver who played one season in 1969 for the New England Patriots. He subsequently became a financial commentator and gold bug, who serves as the chairman and director of the Gold Antitrust Action Committee. He graduated from Cornell University in 1968.

References

External links 
 
 Bill Murphy speaking at the CFTC hearing YouTube (March 25, 2010). Retrieved May 8, 2011

Living people
1946 births
American commodities traders
American financiers
American investors
Business commentators
Boston Patriots players
American football wide receivers
American Football League players
Cornell Big Red football players